Bhamchaur is a village in Bajhang District in the Seti Zone of north-western Nepal. At the time of the 1991 Nepal census it had a population of 3,234 and had 538 houses in the village.

References

Populated places in Bajhang District